The Forum for Democracy and Development (FDD) is a political party in Zambia.

History
The FDD was founded in 2001 by former members of the Movement for Multi-Party Democracy (MMD), disaffected by Frederick Chiluba's efforts to change the constitution to allow him to stand for a third term. In the 2001 general elections it nominated Christon Tembo as its presidential candidate; Tembo finished third in a field of eleven candidates with 13% of the vote. In the National Assembly elections the party received 16% of the vote, winning 12 seats. Three FDD politicians were later invited by President Levy Mwanawasa to serve in a 'unity cabinet', and they were expelled from the party for accepting the invitation.

In 2005 the FDD chose Edith Nawakwi, a former MMD minister, as its president. However, in 2006 the government de-registered the FDD on the grounds that it had failed to submit an annual report. The FDD subsequently joined the United Democratic Alliance, which put forward United Party for National Development leader Hakainde Hichilema as its presidential candidate for the 2006 general elections. Hilchema finished third with 25% of the vote, whilst the UDA won 24 seats in the National Assembly, down from the combined 74 the alliance's member parties had won in 2001.

The FDD did not nominate a candidate for the 2008 presidential by-election, but put forward Nawakwi for the 2011 general elections. She received 0.2% of the vote, finishing seventh out of the nine candidates. The party won a single seat in the National Assembly, Chifumu Banda in Chasefu. Nawakwi ran for the presidency again in the 2015 presidential by-election, finishing third with 0.9% of the vote.

The FDD currently holds one seat in the National Assembly.

Electoral history

Presidential elections

National Assembly elections

References

2001 establishments in Zambia
Political parties established in 2001
Political parties in Zambia
Social democratic parties in Zambia